Edward William Vernon Harcourt DL JP (26 June 1825 – 19 December 1891) was an English naturalist and Conservative politician.

Life
Harcourt was born in Stanton Harcourt, Oxfordshire, the son of Matilda Mary Gooch and the Rev. William Vernon Harcourt who was a scientist, and grandson of Edward Harcourt, Archbishop of York. His brother was the politician Sir William Vernon Harcourt, Chancellor of the Exchequer and Leader of the Opposition.

He matriculated at Christ Church, Oxford in 1843.

Career
Harcourt was a J.P. for Berkshire and Sussex, and a J.P. and Deputy Lieutenant for Oxfordshire and High Sheriff of Oxfordshire in 1875. He was Commanding Officer and later Honorary Colonel of the 1st Cinque Ports Artillery Volunteers of the Royal Artillery. He was a member of Royal Commission for organizing the Volunteer Force in 1862, and was 15 years President of National Artillery Association.

He was the author of Sketch of Madeira (1851) and Sporting in Algeria (1859), published under the name of "Edward Vernon Harcourt". The former was dedicated to his mother-in-law, Harriet Holroyd, Countess of Sheffield.

He inherited Nuneham House and Park in 1871 and had a new Nuneham Courtenay parish church built in 1872–74.

He served as Member of Parliament for Oxfordshire from 1878 to 1885 and for Henley from 1885 to 1886.

Personal life
In 1849, Harcourt was married to Lady Susan Harriet Holroyd (1829–1894), the daughter of George Holroyd, 2nd Earl of Sheffield and Harriet Holroyd, Countess of Sheffield. Together, they were the parents of:

 Edith Harcourt (d. 1944), who married Murray Finch-Hatton, 12th Earl of Winchilsea, in 1875.
 Aubrey Harcourt (1852–1904), who died unmarried.

Harcourt died at Nuneham Park on 19 December 1891. His son died in 1904 and the Nuneham estates passed to Harcourt's brother, Sir William, who died shortly thereafter and his son, Lewis Harcourt, 1st Viscount Harcourt.

References

External links
 

1825 births
1891 deaths
English naturalists
English ornithologists
Conservative Party (UK) MPs for English constituencies
UK MPs 1874–1880
UK MPs 1880–1885
UK MPs 1885–1886
High Sheriffs of Oxfordshire
Deputy Lieutenants of Oxfordshire
Alumni of Christ Church, Oxford